Emmanuel Françoise (born 8 June 1987) is a French professional footballer who plays as a winger or forward for Racing FC Union Luxembourg.

Career
While at Progrès Niederkorn, Françoise scored the opening goal in an unexpected 2–0 win against Scottish side Rangers F.C. in the UEFA Europa League, where the tie ended 2–1 to Progrès, their first ever win in European competition. It was the first goal in Europe for Progrès since 1981.

References

Living people
1987 births
Footballers from Metz
French footballers
Association football wingers
Association football forwards
Ligue 1 players
Ligue 2 players
Regionalliga players
Luxembourg National Division players
Challenger Pro League players
FC Metz players
1. FC Kaiserslautern II players
F91 Dudelange players
C.S. Visé players
U.S. Cremonese players
CS Fola Esch players
FC Progrès Niederkorn players
FC Swift Hesperange players
Racing FC Union Luxembourg players
French expatriate footballers
Expatriate footballers in Germany
French expatriate sportspeople in Germany
Expatriate footballers in Belgium
French expatriate sportspeople in Belgium
Expatriate footballers in Italy
French expatriate sportspeople in Italy
Expatriate footballers in Luxembourg
French expatriate sportspeople in Luxembourg